Ngọc Sơn may refer to several commune-level subdivisions in Vietnam, including:

Ngọc Sơn, Haiphong, a ward of Kiến An District
Ngọc Sơn, Đô Lương, a commune of Đô Lương District in Nghệ An Province
Ngọc Sơn, Bắc Giang, a commune of Hiệp Hòa District
Ngọc Sơn, Hà Nam, a commune of Kim Bảng District
Ngọc Sơn, Hòa Bình, a commune of Lạc Sơn District
Ngọc Sơn, Thanh Hóa, a commune of Ngọc Lặc District
Ngọc Sơn, Quỳnh Lưu, a commune of Quỳnh Lưu District in Nghệ An Province
Ngọc Sơn, Hà Tĩnh, a commune of Thạch Hà District
Ngọc Sơn, Thanh Chương, a commune of Thanh Chương District in Nghệ An Province
Ngọc Sơn, Hải Dương, a commune of Tứ Kỳ District

See also
Ngọc Sơn Temple
Ngọc Sơn (singer)